Denis Hergheligiu (born 9 December 1999) is a Romanian professional footballer who plays for Italian  club Feralpisalò. He has dual Romanian-Italian citizenship.

Club career

Feralpisalò
He first joined Feralpisalò on loan in the summer of 2016, still in the junior teams. On 27 July 2018, as he reached senior team age, the loan was renewed for the 2018–19 season. He made his Serie C debut for FeralpiSalò on 21 October 2018 in a game against Ravenna, as a 68th-minute substitute for Fabio Scarsella.
On 4 July 2019, he moved to Feralpisalò on a permanent basis, signing a 2-year contract.

Career statistics

Club

References

External links
 

1999 births
Living people
Italian people of Romanian descent
Sportspeople from the Province of Brescia
Footballers from Lombardy
Romanian footballers
Italian footballers
Association football midfielders
Serie C players
FeralpiSalò players
Romanian expatriate footballers
Romanian expatriate sportspeople in Italy
Expatriate footballers in Italy